The 1949 Roller Hockey World Cup was the fifth roller hockey world cup, organized by the Fédération Internationale de Patinage a Roulettes (now under the name of Fédération Internationale de Roller Sports). It was contested by 8 national teams (all from Europe) and it is also considered the 1949 European Roller Hockey Championship. All the games were played in the city of Lisbon, in Portugal, the chosen city host.

Results

Standings

See also
FIRS Roller Hockey World Cup
CERH European Roller Hockey Championship

External links
1949 World Cup in rink-hockey.net historical database

Roller Hockey World Cup
International roller hockey competitions hosted by Portugal
1949 in Portuguese sport
1949 in roller hockey